People named Stieler:
 Joseph Karl Stieler, a German painter.
 Adolf Stieler, a German cartographer.
 Karl Stieler, a lawyer and author.

Other uses of the word:
 Stielers Handatlas, named after Adolf Stieler.

See also 
 Stiller (disambiguation)

German-language surnames